Virtue Field is an on-campus stadium at the University of Vermont.  It is home to the Vermont men's and women's lacrosse teams, as well as the men's and women's soccer teams. It will also be the home field for USL League Two expansion side Vermont Green FC, beginning in 2022.

The field is made of artificial turf.

History 
In 2015, lights were added for night competition.

Phase II of the Virtue Field project took place in the summer of 2016 with permanent seating for 2,600 spectators, a press box, and storage space were added.

Vermont played their first night game at Virtue Field on November 11, 2015, a 2–1 overtime win vs. UMBC.

Vermont Green FC won in their home opener, in front of a crowd of 1,001 people. On July 3, 2022 the club set a new attendance record when 1,451 people watched the Green defeat Boston City FC 3-1.

References 

College soccer venues in the United States
College lacrosse venues in the United States
Buildings at the University of Vermont
Year of establishment missing
Vermont Catamounts
Soccer venues in Vermont